Wir essen Seelen in der Nacht is an EP by Gnaw Their Tongues, independently released on November 1, 2014.

Track listing

Personnel
Adapted from the Wir essen Seelen in der Nacht liner notes.
 Maurice de Jong (as Mories) – vocals, instruments, recording, mixing, mastering, cover art

Release history

References

External links 
 
 Wir essen Seelen in der Nacht at Bandcamp

2014 EPs
Gnaw Their Tongues albums